Jenny Margarita Blanco Márquez  (born April 29, 1985) is an actress, TV Host, model and beauty pageant titleholder who was crowned Miss Mundo Dominicana 2012 and represented her country in the 2012 Miss World pageant on August 18, in Ordos. She is from the Dominican Republic.

Pageants

Miss Dominican Republic 2009
Blanco competed in the Miss Dominican Republic 2009 pageant representing the Valverde Province where she finished in the semifinals.

Miss World Dominican Republic 2012
Jenny Blanco was crowned Miss Mundo Dominicana 2012 at the Gran Arena del Cibao in Santiago de los Caballeros during the Dominican Republic Fashion Week. She was to represent her country in the Miss World 2012 pageant on August 18, in Ordos, China but was disqualified for being over the new age limit. She was replaced by Sally Aponte.

Career 

Jenny Blanco is a TV hostess on Telemicro media group.

In 2012 she was elected by Luz García’s Noche de Luz programme as a "Summer’s Hot Body".

Filmography

References

1985 births
Living people
Dominican Republic beauty pageant winners
Miss Dominican Republic
Dominican Republic people of Spanish descent
White Dominicans